The Academia Pomeroy Covered Bridge at  (portal to portal) is the longest remaining covered bridge in Pennsylvania.

Built in 1902, this single-lane, double-span wooden covered bridge crosses Tuscarora Creek between Spruce Hill and Beale Townships, in Juniata County. Its design is based on the Burr truss developed by Theodore Burr, who was the preeminent bridge designer and builder of his time. Owned by the Juniata County Historical Society, located in Mifflintown, since 1962.

It was listed on the National Register of Historic Places in 1979. The bridge is located about a mile east of the Tuscarora Academy, which is also listed on the National Register.

See also
List of bridges documented by the Historic American Engineering Record in Pennsylvania

References

External links

Juniata County Historical Society

SAH Archipedia Building Entry
Tuscarora Academy and Covered Bridge Academia, PA 1-31-12, video slideshow

Covered bridges in Juniata County, Pennsylvania
Bridges in Juniata County, Pennsylvania
Covered bridges on the National Register of Historic Places in Pennsylvania
Bridges completed in 1902
Historic American Engineering Record in Pennsylvania
Tourist attractions in Juniata County, Pennsylvania
Wooden bridges in Pennsylvania
1902 establishments in Pennsylvania
National Register of Historic Places in Juniata County, Pennsylvania
Road bridges on the National Register of Historic Places in Pennsylvania
Burr Truss bridges in the United States